Singl ploče 1979-1982 is the compilation album of the Croatian rock band Azra, released through Jugoton in 1982. It collects ten tracks originally released between 1979 and 1982 as part of four non-album singles. Songs "Đoni, budi dobar" and "Teško vrijeme" are live versions and also appear on live LP Ravno do dna.

Track listing
All music and lyrics written by Branimir Štulić.

Personnel 
Azra
Branimir Štulić – Guitars, lead vocals
Mišo Hrnjak – Bass
Boris Leiner – Drums

Artwork
Nikola & Papp – Design and photography

Production
Husein Hasanefendić – Producer (side one)
Branimir Štulić – Producer (side two)
Siniša Škarica - Executive producer
Recorded by Janko Mlinarić, Petko Kantardžijev (tracks 1 and 2), Mladen Škalec (tracks 6 and 7)

References
 www.discogs.com

Azra albums
1982 albums
Jugoton albums